Chris Evert was the defending champion and successfully defended her title, by defeating Billie Jean King 6–0, 6–4 in the final.

Seeds

Draw

Finals

Top half

Bottom half

References

External links
 Official results archive (ITF)
 Official results archive (WTA)

Advanta Championships of Philadelphia
1978 WTA Tour